Palladam block is a revenue block in the Tiruppur district of Tamil Nadu, India. It has a total of 20 panchayat villages.

Villegas 
 K.Krishnapuram
 Anuppatti
 Puliampatti, Kamanaickenpalayam
 Mallegoundenpalayam
 Paruvai
 Karadivavi
 Vadugapalayam Pudhur
 Kodangipalayam
 Arumuthampalayam
 Chindampalam
 Ichipatti
 Karaipudhur
 Manikkapuram
 Banikkampatti
 Boomalur
 Semmipalayam
 Chukkampalayam
 Velampalayam

References 

 

Revenue blocks of Tiruppur district